Pennsylvania Route 837 (PA 837) is a state route located in western Pennsylvania. The southern terminus of the route is at Pennsylvania Route 88 in the Carroll Township hamlet of Wickerham Manor. The northern terminus is at U.S. Route 19 (US 19) and PA 51 near downtown Pittsburgh at the junction of the Ohio, Allegheny and Monongahela rivers.  The highway parallels the Monongahela River for all of its route with the exceptions of its extreme north and south ends. Popular amusement park Kennywood is located along this route.

Route description

Washington County
PA 837 begins at PA 88 in Carroll Township.  It actually starts toward the east-southeast toward the borough of Donora.  Before entering Donora, it turns to the north and passes the Monessen Bridge and becomes S. McKean Avenue.  It leaves Donora as Meldon Avenue after passing the former site of the Donora-Webster Bridge at 10th Street.

After turning west, PA 837 enters the city of Monongahela where it meets PA 88 again.  It joins PA 88 for  through Monongahela and the borough of New Eagle.  After rounding another bend in the Monongahela River, PA 837 heads for the borough of West Elizabeth.
Sixteen miles of PA 837 is in Washington County.

Allegheny County
In West Elizabeth PA 837 is known as 5th Street (alternately, the Charles McDevitt Memorial Highway, after the former Mayor of that town) before it intersects PA 51 at the Elizabeth Bridge and turns back to the northwest toward the city of Clairton.
In Clairton, PA 837 is known as State Street and passes the Clairton Works, a large coke manufacturer.  Paralleling the Monongahela River, winds through the borough of Dravosburg and the city of Duquesne.  Upon leaving Duquesne, Route 837 becomes Kennywood Blvd. as it passes Kennywood Park, a well-known amusement park in western Pennsylvania.

Shortly after passing Kennywood, PA 837 becomes 8th Avenue in the borough of Homestead.  In Homestead, the highway passes The Waterfront, a large shopping center on the banks of the Monongahela.  West of Homestead, PA 837 encounters a complex interchange with PA 885, Baldwin Rd., and Glass Run Rd.

PA 837 becomes East Carson Street in the South Side Flats neighborhood of the city of Pittsburgh.  East Carson Street is the main road of a major business district in the South Side. Carson Street then passes Station Square before travelling under the Fort Pitt Bridge and ending at the West End Circle.

PA 837 spends almost  in Allegheny County.  It is the south end of five bridges in Pittsburgh and passes under two others.

Allegheny County Belt routes
Two of Allegheny County's colored belt routes align PA 837:
Blue Belt (3.5 miles) from Becks Run Road in Baldwin to Homestead Grays Bridge in Homestead
Green Belt (4 miles) from Rankin Bridge in Whitaker to McKeesport/Duquesne Bridge in Duquesne
A portion of the Orange Belt that was decommissioned in the 1970s also ran along PA 837 for 2.5 miles from the Regis Malady Bridge in Elizabeth to Finleyville-Elrama Road in Elrama

Major intersections

PA 837 Truck

Pennsylvania Route 837 Truck is a truck route of PA 837 signed in 2007.

The route was established for trucks coming onto PA 837 from PA 51 south.  It first utilizes the exit ramps from PA 837 to PA 51 south.  It follows PA 51 south to an interchange at Ridge Road.  It turns left on Ridge Road and makes a U-Turn back onto PA 51 north.  It then utilizes the PA 51 exit ramps to PA 837.

See also

References

External links

Pennsylvania Highways: PA 837

837
Transportation in Washington County, Pennsylvania
Transportation in Allegheny County, Pennsylvania